Termitodesmus ceylonicus is a species of millipede in the family Glomeridesmidae. It is endemic to Sri Lanka.

References

Glomeridesmida
Animals described in 1911
Millipedes of Asia
Endemic fauna of Sri Lanka
Arthropods of Sri Lanka